Guandu may refer to:

Battle of Guandu (官渡之戰), a battle between Cao Cao and Yuan Shao in the Three Kingdoms Period
Guandu Station (關渡站), a station of the Taipei Metro
Guandu District (官渡区), Kunming, People's Republic of China

Towns (官渡镇)
Guandu, in Potou District, Zhanjiang, Guangdong
Guandu, Liuyang, in Liuyang City, Hunan

See also
 Guandu River (disambiguation)